This article displays the squads for the 2011 World Men's Handball Championship. Each team consisted of 16 players.

Appearances, goals and ages as of tournament start, 16 January 2009.

Group A

Head coach:  Claude Onesta

Players

Head coach:  János Hajdul

Players

Head coach:  Zoltán Heister

Players

Head coach:  Vasile Stîngă

Players

Head coach:  Eduardo Gallardo

Players



Group B



7th



Group C













Group D













References

World Mens Handball Championship Squads, 2019
2019 squads